Palacio de Deportes de Santander is an arena in Santander, Cantabria, Spain.  It is primarily used for basketball and handball.  The arena has 6,000 seats.

See also
 List of tennis stadiums by capacity

External links 

Arena information 

Indoor arenas in Spain
Buildings and structures in Cantabria
Basketball venues in Spain
Handball venues in Spain
Tourist attractions in Cantabria
Sport in Santander, Spain